The twenty-first series of the British reality television programme The Only Way Is Essex was confirmed on 3 June 2015 when it was announced that it had renewed for at least a further six series, taking it up to 21 series. The series began on 10 September 2017 with the cast going to Marbella, and concluded after seventeen episodes on 5 November 2017, making it the second longest series to date after it was confirmed that the lengths of each series would be extended. Ahead of the series it was announced that James Argent would be returning to the series following his break from the show. It was also confirmed that after making brief appearances during the previous series, Lauren Pope and Mario Falcone would be returning to the series as a full-time cast member. With this announcement, it was revealed that Mike Hassini would also be returning to the series having previously left the show after the eighteenth series. Former cast member Elliott Wright also made an appearance during the second episode of the series, whilst Vas J Morgan also returned to the show mid-way through the series. This was also the first series to include new cast members Ruby Lacey and Taylor Barnett. Former cast member Danielle Armstrong also made a brief return to the series, appearing in the Halloween special episode airing on 29 October 2017. During the series it was announced that Carol Wright had quit the show. A further Essexmas episode aired on 17 December 2017.

This series focused on the strain on Chloe M and Courtney's friendship and their bickering boyfriends, as well as Gemma struggling to come to terms with her feelings towards Arg. It also included the final nail in the coffin for Pete and Megan's turbulent relationship, Dan and Amber T fail to make a relationship work, and Lauren and Jon's very brief romance.

Cast

Episodes

{| class="wikitable plainrowheaders" style="width:100%; background:#fff;"
! style="background:#2E2EFE;"| Seriesno.
! style="background:#2E2EFE;"| Episodeno.
! style="background:#2E2EFE;"| Title
! style="background:#2E2EFE;"| Original air date
! style="background:#2E2EFE;"| Duration
! style="background:#2E2EFE;"| UK viewers

|}

Reception

Ratings

References

The Only Way Is Essex
2017 British television seasons